The 1980 United States Senate election in New York was held on November 4, 1980. Incumbent Republican U.S. Senator Jacob Javits  was defeated in the primary by Al D'Amato. D'Amato went on to win the general election over Elizabeth Holtzman and Javits, who remained in the race as the candidate of the Liberal Party of New York.

Background
Even as early as his time in the U.S. House in the 1940s, Jacob Javits had been one of the most liberal members of the Republican Party. However, his electability in an otherwise Democratic-leaning state and considerable influence within the Senate allowed him to maintain strength within the party, and he had been able to win election to four terms in the Senate even as his views became less and less popular among Republican loyalists. By 1979, he had become the longest-serving U.S. Senator in New York state history.

For years, Javits had been considered politically "invincible," but had become vulnerable in 1980 in part due to the rise of the Conservative Party of New York, which had cut into the Republican base. Conservatives argued that no Republican could win a general election without their endorsement. In 1970, liberal Republican Senator Charles Goodell lost re-election to Conservative James L. Buckley. In Javits's prior two re-elections in 1968 and 1974, he had been held to less than a majority by strong Conservative performances.

Javits also faced criticisms from liberals in the state over his tepid opposition to the Vietnam War nearly a decade prior; among other things, he had failed to co-sponsor Goodell's amendment to set a deadline for American withdrawal from Vietnam. Javits had also been outflanked by Buckley in 1974, when the Conservative Senator called for the resignation of Richard Nixon while Javits demurred.

Republican primary

Background
Before 1980, Javits had never faced a primary challenge. However, amid widespread speculation that he would not run, two challengers entered the race: Queens attorney James Eagan, a political unknown, and Hempstead supervisor Al D'Amato. D'Amato, who locked up support from Republican leaders on Long Island and had strong ties to the Conservative Party which would ensure his cross-endorsement, was considered a serious threat. On January 17, former Representative Ralph Caputo announced that he would enter the race for the Conservative and Republican nominations, assuming Javits ran. Both he and D'Amato argued that a Conservative-Republican fusion would be unbeatable if Javits remained on the Liberal ticket.

However, neither Caputo nor D'Amato were the Conservatives' first choice. Most speculation surrounded Representative Jack Kemp, a leading Conservative Party fundraiser and active supporter of Ronald Reagan's campaign for President. Kemp was all but assured of the Conservative nomination if he desired it. He told supporters that he would not challenge Javits, but publicly said there was "a good chance" he would run if Javits retired. The Conservatives withheld their formal endorsement from D'Amato, Caputo, or any other candidate in hopes that Javits would not run and Kemp would. 

Javits initially said he would announce his intent before February 12, but delayed that decision two weeks, citing his health. Javits also refused to fundraise before formally announcing his campaign despite changes in the law that would have allowed it. When he did finally announce his re-election bid on February 25, Javits shocked supporters by revealing had been diagnosed with a form of amyotrophic lateral sclerosis, better known as Lou Gehrig's disease, eighteen months earlier. Javits said his diagnosis was "indolent." Dr. Jerome B. Posner of the Sloan-Kettering Institute confirmed that the disease would not affect Javits's cognition and said he believed Javits could serve out the six-year term. (Javits ultimately died in March 1986, roughly one year before his term would have ended.)

Candidates
Al D'Amato,  Presiding Supervisor of the Town of Hempstead
Jacob Javits, incumbent U.S. Senator since 1957

Withdrew
Bruce Caputo, former U.S. Representative from Yonkers and nominee for Lieutenant Governor in 1978
James Eagan, Queens attorney

Declined
Jack Kemp, U.S. Representative from Buffalo
Henry Kissinger, former U.S. Secretary of State

Campaign

Conservative nomination: D'Amato vs. Caputo
Javits's announcement livened the race, which instantly centered on his long record. Though some continued to urge Kemp to run, he ruled himself out. Thus, the primary campaign essentially became a two-stage contest: between Caputo and D'Amato for the Conservative nomination and then between the Conservative choice and Javits for the Republican nomination, though Caputo pledged he would remain in the race if he lost the Conservative nomination, disputing the assumption that the two would split the anti-Javits vote. Caputo, considered a "handsome, media-wise candidate" with "something of a national reputation," was considered a stronger opponent against Javits but faced an uphill battle against D'Amato, who was considered the more conservative of the two, although unknown outside of Long Island. D'Amato campaigned on Caputo's support for the Humphrey–Hawkins Full Employment Act and opposition to the B-1 bomber.

On March 22, the Conservative state committee gave their informal endorsement to D'Amato, pledging to formalize the nomination in June. The was considerable haggling over whether the committee would weight their votes by party support, which D'Amato favored since most of his strength was in the Conservative base of Queens, Nassau, and Suffolk. The final weighted vote backed D'Amato over Caputo nearly two-to-one.

In preliminary speeches, D'Amato backers stressed his long standing in the Conservative Party and his ability to get on the Republican primary ballot without resorting to an expensive petition drive, since he had the necessary party committee support.

After the announcement, Caputo said he would remain in the race. D'Amato said he would contest the general election even if he lost the primary.

D'Amato vs. Javits
Few initially believed that D'Amato could unseat Javits in the primary.

Results

Democratic primary

Candidates
 Elizabeth Holtzman, U.S. Representative from Brooklyn
 John Lindsay, former Mayor of New York City and Republican U.S. Representative
 Bess Myerson, former Commissioner of the New York City Department of Consumer Affairs and Miss America 1945
 John J. Santucci, Queens County District Attorney

Declined
 Joseph A. Califano, former U.S. Secretary of Health, Education, and Welfare

Campaign
The Democratic field included four major candidates. Bess Myerson was the early favorite, having the support of Senator Daniel Patrick Moynihan, New York City mayor Ed Koch, and Governor Hugh Carey. Nevertheless, Myerson's campaign was reliant on her statewide celebrity status as a former Miss America winner and TV personality. If she faltered, most expected Representative Elizabeth Holtzman to take the lead. She had already unseated House dean Emanuel Celler in 1972, and as a member of the House Judiciary Committee, took a leading role in the Nixon impeachment hearings. The third leading candidate, former mayor of New York City John Lindsay, was considered popular with minority voters but struggled to escape his controversial eight-year tenure as mayor, which some city residents blamed for the near-bankruptcy of the city in 1975.

Holtzman rose quickly in the primary, despite her difficulty expressing criticism of Senator Javits, who remained popular with the same liberal Democrats who supported her campaign. During the campaign, Holtzman boasted that she was "never been hand-picked by the bosses. I have never been hand-picked by anyone.", in a thinly-veiled dig to her opponents. Holtzman touted her legislative record, implicitly criticizing Myerson's lack of actual political experience, and her support for women's rights, having secured an extension for the Equal Rights Amendment's 1979 ratification. Myerson also struggled to define herself ideologically, and by late March Holtzman had already pulled ahead in at least one poll.

Results

Liberal nomination 
 Jacob Javits, incumbent U.S. Senator (registered Republican)

Although Elizabeth Holtzman sought the Liberal Party nomination, the party stuck with Javits, a decision which was to prove pivotal in the general election.

General election

Campaign
D'Amato, also running on the Conservative line, proceeded to defeat Democratic U.S. Representative Elizabeth Holtzman and Javits, who ran on the Liberal Party ticket. In the traditionally liberal state of New York, Javits split the Democratic vote with Holtzman, to give D'Amato a close victory.

Results

See also 
 1980 United States Senate elections

References 

1980
New York
1980 New York (state) elections